Alex Rodger (1907–1982) was a British occupational psychologist.

Career
After reading psychology at the University of Cambridge, Rodger began work in the National institute of Industrial Psychology in London. During the war he worked in government departments and rose to the post of Senior Principal Psychologist in the Admiralty. After the war he moved to academia and held the post of Reader in Psychology (1948-1960) and then Professor of Occupational Psychology (1960-1975) at Birkbeck College, London. In 1983 an annual Alec Rodger Memorial Lecture was established at Birkbeck College.

He published on various aspects of occupational psychology. His most influential publication was his seven point plan for occupational assessment.

He was very active in the British Psychological Society in which he held the post of Honorary Secretary and then President. He also edited Occupational Psychology from 1946 to 1968.

Works
Rodger, A. (1968) The Seven Point Plan.

Honours
 President, British Psychological Society, 1957–58

References 

1907 births
1982 deaths
British psychologists
Presidents of the British Psychological Society
20th-century psychologists